This is a listing of the horses that finished in either first, second, or third place and the number of starters in the Suwannee River Stakes, an American Grade 3 race for Open to fillies and mares four-year-olds and up, at 1-1/8 miles (9 furlongs)on synthetic surface held at Gulfstream Park in Hallandale Beach, Florida.  (List 1973–present)

A # designates that the race was run in more than one division that year.

References 

Gulfstream Park
Graded stakes races in the United States
Horse races in Florida